Abitibi-Ouest is a provincial electoral district in the Abitibi-Témiscamingue region of Quebec, Canada, that elects members to the National Assembly of Quebec. It notably includes the municipalities of Amos, La Sarre, Macamic, Barraute, Palmarolle, Trécesson, Saint-Félix-de-Dalquier and Sainte-Germaine-Boulé

The riding was created for the 1944 election from a part of Abitibi.

In the change from the 2001 to the 2011 electoral map, Abitibi-Ouest gained the municipality of Barraute, as well as the part of the unorganized territory of Lac-Despinassy that it did not already have, from Abitibi-Est.

Members of the Legislative Assembly / National Assembly

Election results

References

External links
Information
 Elections Quebec

Election results
 Election results (National Assembly)

  (Radio-Canada) 
  (La Presse)

Maps
 2011 map (PDF)
 2001 map (Flash)
2001–2011 changes (Flash)
1992–2001 changes (Flash)
 Electoral map of Abitibi-Témiscamingue region
 Quebec electoral map, 2011

Amos, Quebec
Quebec provincial electoral districts